Middelstum is a village with a population of 2,419 in the province of Groningen in the Netherlands. It is located in the municipality of Eemsdelta.

Middelstum was a separate municipality until 1990, when it was merged with Loppersum.

History 
The village was first mentioned between 822 and 856 as Mitilistenheim, and means "settlement in the middle". Middelstum is a terp (artificial living hill) village which probably developed in Roman times. It consists of three "house" terps which have grown together. It has a radial structure and ring road.

The Dutch Reformed church was built in several stages during the 15th century. The tower dates from 1487. Between 1661 and 1662, a dome with carillon was place on top of the tower.

Middelstum was home to 1,737 people in 1840.

Gallery

References

External links

 All information about Middelstum (in Dutch)

Populated places in Groningen (province)
Former municipalities of Groningen (province)
Eemsdelta